CHRT might refer to:

 Cambridge-Huntingdon Rapid Transit Scheme, a public transport project
 Canadian Human Rights Tribunal
 Chartered Semiconductor Manufacturing, a company
 CHRT-FM in Trail, British Columbia, Canada
 Hormone Replacement Therapy (HRT) having undergone compounding